Other People's Heartache is a series of mixtapes by Bastille. The first was released in February 2012, the second in December 2012, the third in December 2014, and the fourth in December 2018.

Part one 

Other People's Heartache is a cover EP, self-released by the band Bastille in February 2012. Dan Smith described the concept behind the release as being to "create a fictional film score or film soundtrack using cover versions of songs". It was released online, available free. Smith stated that the group were contacted and asked to take down the tracks. The tracks "Of the Night" and "What Would You Do?" were later released on the compilation album All This Bad Blood (2013), with the former also released as a single.

Track listing 
The EP was composed of mashups of cover versions and samples of other artists' music, film quotes, and the band's own songs.

Critical response 
PopMatters gave the EP 8/10, hailing it for "demonstrating the power of a good cover".

Part two 

Other People's Heartache, Pt. 2 is a cover EP self-released by Bastille in December 2012.

Track listing 
Like the previous installment, Other People's Heartache, Pt. 2 largely comprises  mashups of samples, cover songs, film quotes and the band's own music.

Critical reception 
Cherwell gave the EP 4/5, commending its having built upon Part One, saying "Dan Smith getting even more ingenious with his connections between film and music and adventurous with his production". It praised the humour of the sampling: "'Sweet Pompeii', mostly a soulful cover of Calvin Harris' 'Sweet Nothing', almost seems like a practical joke on the listener as we go from the verse to a clip of Bernie Sanders talking about the economy to a hilariously unexpected sample of the exact beat break from Harris’ version."

Part three 

VS. (Other People's Heartache, Pt. III) is an EP by Bastille, released in December 2014. Unlike the previous two EPs it does not feature covers, but instead a number of collaborations with other musical artists on original tracks, and was the first to be released commercially. The track "The Driver" was released as a part of a re-scored version of Drive.

Track listing

Critical reception 
The Guardian gave the EP 3/5 remarking that "most of the eight mashups and collaborations here feel fresh, even urgent". Digital Spy also awarded it 3/5, calling it a "mixed bag of a mixtape", drawing attention to "Fall Into Your Arms" and "Bite Down" as "highpoints". PopMatters gave it 7/10, calling "another fine outing for this impressive group, one that proves, much like its predecessors, that Bastille does its cleverest work when it goes off-album."

Part four

Other People's Heartache, Pt. 4 was released digitally on 7 December 2018 and on clear vinyl for Record Store Day on 13 April 2019.

Track listing

Give Me the Future + Dreams of the Past 
Give Me the Future + Dreams of the Past is the Super Deluxe Edition of the Give Me the Future album; it was released on 26 August 2022. The album includes three "Paths": the original 13 Give Me the Future tracks, 8 tracks under the name Dreams of the Past, and 6 tracks under the Other People's Heartache name for a total of 9 new tracks.

References

External links 

Bastille (band) albums